Year 1023 (MXXIII) was a common year starting on Tuesday (link will display the full calendar) of the Julian calendar.

Events 
 By place 

 Europe 
 The Judge-Governor of Seville in Al-Andalus (modern Spain) takes advantage of the disintegration of the Caliphate of Córdoba and seizes power as Abbad I, founding the Abbadid dynasty.
 December – Abbad I declares the Taifa of Seville independent from Córdoban rule. Abd ar-Rahman V is proclaimed Caliph at Córdoba.

 Asia 
 April/May (Jian 3, 4th month) – An epidemic in Kyoto (Japan) is so severe that there are corpses in the streets; disease spreads throughout the country.
 60th birthday and longevity ceremony of Japanese matriarch Minamoto no Rinshi, wife of Fujiwara no Michinaga.
 The Ghaznavid Empire occupies Transoxiana (approximate date).

 By topic 

 Religion 
 The Dom Church at Utrecht (modern Netherlands) is severely damaged by fire. Bishop Adalbold II begins construction of a new Romanesque style church.

Births 
 Lý Thánh Tông, Vietnamese emperor (d. 1072)
 Otto I (or Odon), count of Savoy (approximate date)
 Ramon Berenguer I, count of Barcelona (d. 1076)
 William VII ("the Bold"), duke of Aquitaine (d. 1058)

Deaths 
 March 27 – Gebhard I, bishop of Regensburg
 May 28 – Wulfstan (or Lupus), archbishop of York
October 18 – Zirid princess and regent
 October 21 – Gero, archbishop of Magdeburg
 October 24 – Kou Zhun, Chinese grand chancellor 
 November 24 – Eilward, bishop of Dresden-Meissen
 December 5 – Hartwig, archbishop of Salzburg
 Abū Hayyān al-Tawhīdī, Muslim intellectual (b. 923)
 Godfrey II, count and duke of Lower Lorraine (b. 965)
 Llywelyn ap Seisyll, king of Gwynedd and Powys
 Oda of Haldensleben, duchess of the Polans
 Sitt al-Mulk, Fatimid princess and regent (b. 970)

References